The Torres Atrio (English: Atrium Towers), is an architectural complex under construction in Bogotá. When complete, the South Tower will be the tallest building in Colombia at approximately 879 feet (268 m) in height. The complex is located at the intersection of Caracas Avenue and El Dorado Avenue. The complex will include two towers, the North Tower with 44 floors and the South Tower with 67. The Torres Atrio are being built on the former Gonzalo Jiménez de Quesada Convention Center and an adjacent parking lot.

References
 
 

Skyscrapers in Colombia